The Detroit Economic Club, headquartered at 211 West Fort Street in downtown Detroit, Michigan, was formed in 1934 as a platform for the discussion and debate of business, government and social issues. It hosts speakers from business, academic, and government officials, who address members and their guests at the Club's 35-meeting season, to its 3,500 members. The DEC have hosted every sitting U.S. President since Richard Nixon.

History 
The Detroit Economic Club was founded in 1934 by Allen Crow. The objective of the Club was to promote an interest in, and to enlighten its members on governmental, economic and societal issues. In the first year, 275 men joined. Women were not admitted until 1973 after Michigan ratified the Equal Rights Amendment.  Within five years of the inception, the Club's membership had grown to 1,100 and post World War II the membership was approaching 2,000. The logo of the Club is an Aladdin's Lamp, which Crow selected it because it was the Greek symbol for enlightenment.

Operation 

The main activity of the club is usually in the form of a breakfast or lunch-business meeting setting. The club presents, on average, 35 meetings per year.  Where the speaker(s) take the podium/stage and address whatever their topic is at that time. Speakers usually speak for about 20–30 minutes, and there is reserved times for networking and questions. Traditionally, the club would meet on Mondays. The history goes back before commercial air travel and the meetings were scheduled by Allen Crow on Monday's so that the speakers could travel to Detroit by train over the weekend and this would conserve their weekly business time.  The originally annual dues were $5.00 and tickets were $1.50. The club has five categories of memberships, ranging from Young Leader dues at $75.00 to Gold Membership at $500.00. The club's meeting place was and still are some of the same venues from the early stages of the club such as: the Book Cadillac Hotel (now the Westin Book Cadillac), and later a number of the Club's meetings took place at Cobo Hall, and is still a principal location.

Speakers 

In the early days, speakers were paid, but this practice was and speakers now come because for the prestigious forum and the outreach. In addition to the newspaper coverage that the speakers receive, a number of radio stations use to broadcast the meetings, and was carried to about 400,000 Metro-Detroit area homes. There is still the newspaper and radio coverage, but also live streams for viewers. The club has hosted a meeting with every President of the United States since former President Nixon. The first woman speaker at the DEC was Catherine Curtis on November 1, 1937, and she spoke on "The Housewife as Capitalist." The first Black speaker was Lester Granger, President of  the National Urban League, on January 19, 1948. Other speakers include Soviet Ambassador to the U.S. Antoly Dobrynin, Bruno Kreisky when he was the Australian Chancellor, and Ambassador of the Republic of Cuba to the U.S. Jose Ramon Cabanas Rodriguez.

Presidents (DEC Presidents) 
The President of the Club, historically, was the chief operating officer as well as the president. Nowadays, those titles and tasks are handled by two separate individuals. Since the first President and Founder, Allen B. Crow, there has been nine others. Lester Skene Bork, Walker Lee Cisler, (who was also one of the founding members of the National Academy of Engineering) Russel A. Swaney, Theodore H. Mecke, Jr., Wesley R. Johnson, (also served as President of Woodall Industries and Libbey Owens Ford Plastics before retiring and serving the DEC) Gerald E. Warren, William R. Halling, (served on the Board of Directors for: Compuware and KPMG, LLP and also the third-longest presidential term for the Club) and Elizabeth "Beth" Chappell, who served the Club for 15 years, which is the second longest term after the Founder, Allen B. Crow.

The current President and CEO of the Club is Steve Grigorian, who has served since 2017.

Young Leader Program 

The Young Leader Program was launched in 2007. Its members are made up of over 1,200 young professionals in out of the Metro-Detroit area. All YL members are under the age of 40 years.  YL members allowed to regular DEC meetings, but also have their own meetings of their own. In addition to hosting an annual Young Leader Conference.

Career Readiness Academy (CRA) 

The Detroit Economic Club’s Career Readiness Academy is a 6-month program that brings high school and Young Leader (YLs) members together for monthly meetings that aim to teach skills that will help the students navigate their high school journey and forges mentor-mentee relationships. The monthly sessions are broke up into 6 groups, specifically to educate these students on career exploration, economic realities, college, and a number of other amazing tools that they will need as they work their way into the career path of their liking.

National Summit
In June 2009, the DEC hosted a summit on Technology, Energy, Environment, and Manufacturing.

See also

Detroit Athletic Club
Economy of metropolitan Detroit
Detroit Club

References

External links
 Detroit Economic Club
 National Summit
 Detroit Economic Club events on C-SPAN

Organizations established in 1934
Organizations based in Detroit
Business organizations based in the United States